The Profitable house of S.N. Mnatsakanova is a building in Rostov-on-Don located on Pushkinskaya Street (house 65). The mansion was built during 1911 — 1915. According to the reference media about assessment immovable property, in 1911 — 1915 Serpuga Nikokhosyanovna Mnatsakanova owned the building. According to the reference media "All Rostov and Nakhchivan — on — Don for 1914", in the building the technical office Nessara was placed. Now the house consists of the trade rooms located on the first floor and inhabited, which are located on the second and third floors which considerable proportion belongs to the Rostov businessman Kurinov Alexander Gennadyevich. The building has the status of an object of cultural heritage of regional value (the order "Regional Inspectorate for Protection and Operation of Historical and Cultural Monuments" of 29.12.2004 № 191 "About the approval of the list of the revealed objects of cultural heritage").

History and description 

The house on Pushkinskaya Street between Budennovsky Avenue and Soborny Lane was built during 1911 — 1915 on the project of architects E. Gulin and S. Popilin in the modernist style. S. Poplin was a civil engineer, the member of the commission on the construction of the building of District court, public City Council in 1903 — 1913, participated in the telephone and technical commissions of the city. In two years after construction of the building "Profitable house of S.N. Mnatsakanov, head of the 20th century", in 1914, Semyon Vasilyevich Poplin on Pushkinskaya Street built the close profitable house on architecture the Profitable house Bostrikinykh (nowadays the building of Sberbank of Russia).

During the pre-revolutionary period the structure "The profitable house of S.N. Mnatsakanova, head of the 20th century" had the address: Pushkinskaya (Kuznetskaya) St., 81. Till 1911 the building was estimated at 3 700 rubles, and in 1915 its assessment made 25 100 rubles. S.N. Mnatsakanova owned the building. Rod Mnatsakanovykh was known in a business community of aged Rostov. Several representatives of a sort were engaged in trade activity: A. M. and P.M. Mnatsakanova traded in groceries and wine; the trading house of successors of K. Mnatsakanov did business by groceries and braids.

After 1917, this house, as well as many others, the fate of nationalization comprehended and in it, communal flats are placed. For years the house withered, collapsed, changing tentative fine shape. During the operation of the building, internal rooms underwent multiple plannings in connection with each new adaptation. Fillings window and doorways, a collar of intra domestic journey, a protection of balconies are replaced, entrances to rooms of the first floor in eastern and western parts of the southern facade of the building are arranged padding.

In the period of the end of the 1990th - the beginning of 2000, was acquired by the Rostov businessman Kurinov Alexander Gennadyevich the specified building. Dozens of residents from communal flats were moved to individual housing. During the period from 1998 to 2002, the complex of repair and restoration works was executed that helped to keep a historical appearance of one of the central streets of Rostov-on-Don. On remained to details and photos the shape of an attic, parapets, balconies are restored, coloring of a facade is picked carefully up. The special pride of the building — the forged protections of balconies and entrance gate executed by members of the Union of designers of Russia Vasily Saliyenko and the Union of artists of Russia Igor Savitsky. In an upper of a gate, Kurinov A. G. initials are executed. The unique handle on an entrance door was executed in the foundry workshop "Classic". In the course of restoration for facing of a socle and piers of the first floor, the marble and granite brought from Italy are used. House illumination is thought over and solved at night. Thus the most difficult task of return of a former building image and maintaining mission of the inhabited and profitable house was carried out.

The three-storied building is located on a red line of a building of Pushkinskaya Street. The building of a P-shaped configuration in the plan, with the cellar and a mnogoskatny roof, brick, is plastered and painted by architectural coatings. Volume the structure is characteristic of the classical profitable house with a placement of the multiroom apartments let on the top floors and trade enterprises — on the first floor. A core of composition is the internal front staircase with a lobby, the buildings located in the central part. The composition solution of the main southern facade is determined by an arrangement of raskrepovka — extreme western and east, in the level of the second and third floors accented by balconies. Stroyenny acoustical window openings in the level of the mansard floor finish raskrepovka. The architectural and art shape of the main southern facade is supplemented by shod steel protections of balconies of geometrical and azhury ornaments and dvupolny steel-shod gate with a similar ornament.

References 

Tourist attractions in Rostov-on-Don
Buildings and structures in Rostov-on-Don
Cultural heritage monuments in Rostov-on-Don
Cultural heritage monuments of regional significance in Rostov Oblast